The 1955 Ohio State Buckeyes football team represented the Ohio State University in the 1955 Big Ten Conference football season. The Buckeyes compiled a 7–2 record.

Schedule

Game Summaries

Nebraska

Stanford

Illinois

Duke

Wisconsin

Northwestern

Indiana

Iowa

Michigan

Coaching staff
 Woody Hayes - Head Coach - 5th year

Awards and honors
 Howard Cassady, Heisman Trophy

Trivia
 The November 12 game against Iowa was mentioned in the movie Back to the Future Part II. A radio announcer telling the scores of the day's games mentions that Ohio State beat Iowa 20-10.

1956 NFL draftees

References

Ohio State
Ohio State Buckeyes football seasons
Big Ten Conference football champion seasons
Ohio State Buckeyes football